is a Japanese wrestler. He competed in the men's Greco-Roman 57 kg at the 1996 Summer Olympics.

References

External links
 

1967 births
Living people
Japanese male sport wrestlers
Olympic wrestlers of Japan
Wrestlers at the 1996 Summer Olympics
People from Kagoshima Prefecture
Wrestlers at the 1998 Asian Games
Asian Games competitors for Japan
Asian Wrestling Championships medalists
20th-century Japanese people